Chaypee is the Wampanoag name for a hummock along the Slocum River, in Dartmouth, Massachusetts. The name means "Land of the two hills". Three other hummocks are nearby, Pesket, Pashhok, and Campeetset. Chaypee Hill Farm, a former dairy, sits atop the hummock. It is rumored that several oaks on the hummock were planted by then Harvard College student Isoroku Yamamoto, who later commanded the Japanese flotilla that attacked Pearl Harbor. The Lloyd Center for Environmental Studies is next door.

Landforms of Bristol County, Massachusetts